Surprise Surprise is the 1982 studio album of Mezzoforte on Steinar. Their fourth album originally released in Iceland as 4 with a different cover made the band famous worldwide when, after the international release, the single "Garden Party" hit the charts.

Background
Earlier in 1982, the second keyboard player, Bjorn Thorarensen who's been with them for their previous two albums, left Mezzoforte. The saxophone player Kristinn Svavarsson became a full member after playing as a guest on the band's first two albums. Surprise Surprise was recorded at PRT Studios, London in July–August 1982 and mixed at Red Bus Studios in September. It was the second time the band worked with producer Geoff Calver in London after the recording of their second album Í Hakanum released internationally as Mezzoforte and re-released as Octopus in 1996 in 1980. Despite gaining some popularity and playing concerts in the UK, the album was first released in Iceland in 1982 simply named 4 and then renamed Surprise Surprise for the international release.

Cover
Surprise Surprise was originally released in Iceland as 4 with a different cover, but the record company decided to use the cover of Mezzoforte's third album Þvílíkt Og Annað Eins, released only in Iceland for the international release. The 1996 remastered version was released with the slightly modified international cover. This edition has a few discrepancies: Chris Hunter and Bill Eldridge are credited as trumpet and saxophone players respectively this mistake was even present on the band's official website for a while Eirikur Ingolfsson is not credited as percussionist, and Shady Calver is credited on her maiden name: Shady Owens.

"Garden Party"
"Garden Party" was chosen to be released as a single, even though the band wasn't sure whether to include the song on the album. It became Mezzoforte's biggest hit and charted in most European countries and Japan. After its success the band moved to England and started touring in Europe. "Garden Party" has been featured in TV programs and commercials, gaining even more publicity for Mezzoforte through the years. The song was covered by Herb Alpert in 1983.

Track listing

Charts

Personnel
Mezzoforte:
 Fridrik Karlsson Guitars (Yamaha and Ibanez electric, Ramirez acoustic), Percussion
 Eythor Gunnarsson Keyboards (Rhodes, MiniMoog, Grand Piano, OBX-A, Jupiter 8, Prophet V, Roland Vocoder), Percussion
 Johann Asmundsson Bass Guitars (JA-Special, Yamaha, Fender fretless), Percussion
 Gulli Briem Drums (Premier drums), Percussion
 Kristinn Svavarsson Saxophones (Yamaha alto, Selmer MK VI '58 tenor), Percussion

Additional musicians:
 Louis Jardim Percussion
 Eirikur Ingolfsson Percussion
 Shady Calver Voice
 Chris Cameron Voice
 Steve Dawson Flugelhorn on Garden Party
 Winston Sela OBX programming

Horns Section:
 Chris Hunter Alto Saxophone, Tenor Saxophone
 Bill Eldridge Trumpet
 Martin Dobson Tenor Saxophone
 Stuart Brooks Trumpet

Technical:
 Ernst J. Backman: Original International Artwork
 Geoff Calver: Producer, Engineer
 Jonatan Gardarsson: Editor
 Eirikur Ingolfsson: 1996 Liner notes
 Seventh Heaven: 1996 Artwork and design
 Oskar Pall Sveinsson: 1996 Digital Remaster

Release history

References

1982 albums
Mezzoforte (band) albums